Jenna Nicole Mourey (born September 15, 1986), better known as  Jenna Marbles, is an American former YouTuber. Over the span of ten years, her YouTube channel has accumulated approximately 1.7 billion video views and over 20 million subscribers.

Early life and career
Mourey was born and raised in Rochester, New York. She then moved to Boston, Massachusetts, where she earned a Bachelor of Science in psychology at Suffolk University and Master of Education in sport psychology and counseling at Boston University.

In the summer of 2010, Mourey was sharing a three-bedroom apartment in Cambridge, Massachusetts. She supported herself by bartending, working at a tanning salon, vlogging, and go-go dancing at nightclubs. That year, Mourey started her career with Barstool Sports, where she wrote for their female-oriented site StoolLaLa. She left the publication in 2011.

YouTube career
Among the first of Mourey's videos to gain traction on the platform, "How to Trick People into Thinking You're Good Looking", released in 2010, was viewed around 5.3 million times in its first week. Her video "How to Avoid Talking to People You Don't Want to Talk To" was featured in The New York Times and ABC News in August 2011. In the video, she said, "I'm sick and tired of guys thinking that just because I showed up at a club or a dance or a bar that I want to have their genitalia touching my backside."

Mourey adopted the pseudonym Jenna Marbles after her mother complained the search term "Mourey" resulted only in Jenna's videos on Google. Jenna's mother was unemployed when Jenna's first video went viral and was concerned that the content might put off potential employers. The name "Marbles" stems from her dog's name, Mr. Marbles.

Mourey portrayed Eve in the Epic Rap Battles of History episode "Adam vs. Eve", and she made appearances in The Annoying Orange, Ridiculousness, and Smosh: The Movie. Mourey was featured in the rapper Pitbull's "Fireball" music video alongside fellow YouTubers Bart Baker and Brittany Furlan.

Alongside the creators of the YouTube channel Smosh, Mourey became the first YouTube personality to have her likeness appear as a wax figure displayed at Madame Tussauds New York, which she unveiled in 2015.

Controversy and indefinite hiatus
On June 25, 2020, Mourey uploaded an apology video following accusations of blackface and racism. In this video, she addresses offensive content in her videos posted between 2011 and 2012. This included an impersonation of Nicki Minaj, rapping anti-Asian slander while wearing traditional Asian clothing, and shaming women who had slept with multiple people, which she attributed to internalized misogyny. Mourey states it was never her intent to hurt or offend anyone, acknowledging that these actions were "shameful" and "awful", wishing "it wasn't part of [her] past". She followed up these remarks by announcing her indefinite hiatus from YouTube. On June 26, Mourey's boyfriend, Julien Solomita, announced on Twitter that the couple's joint podcast and Twitch streams would also be put on indefinite hiatus. Public reaction to Mourey's apology was largely positive; The Berkeley Beacon noted that Mourey "was not the first to use the term 'accountability' in a YouTube apology, but she may have been the first one to actually mean it".

Other ventures
Mourey released a brand of dog toys called Kermie Worm & Mr. Marbles. The toys are modeled after her dogs' likenesses. She also created items with some of her most popular phrases printed on them, including "What are this?" and "Team legs!" Mourey previously hosted a weekly pop countdown on SiriusXM Hits 1 named YouTube 15. In 2016, Mourey became an executive producer for Maximum Ride, a film based on James Patterson's series of novels of the same name.

Personal life
In April 2021, Mourey became engaged to long-time partner Julien Solomita. They married in November 2022. In January 2023, Mourey and Solomita had an incident at their home where an intruder broke in, was subdued with pepper spray, and arrested.

Awards and nominations

References

External links

 
 
 

1986 births
21st-century American women
American podcasters
American women podcasters
American YouTubers
Barstool Sports people
Boston University School of Education alumni
Comedy YouTubers
Living people
People from Rochester, New York
Shorty Award winners
Streamy Award winners
Suffolk University alumni
American video bloggers
Women video bloggers
YouTube podcasters
YouTube vloggers